Events in the year 1905 in India.

Incumbents
 Emperor of India – Edward VII
 Viceroy of India – George Curzon, 1st Marquess Curzon of Kedleston
 Viceroy of India – Gilbert Elliot-Murray-Kynynmound, 4th Earl of Minto (from 18 November)

Events
 National income - 9,910 million
 4 April – The 7.8  Kangra earthquake shook the Kangra Valley with a maximum EMS-98 intensity of IX (Destructive), killing more than 20,000 people
 Partition of Bengal.
 George, Prince of Wales and Princess Mary tour India, 1905–06

Law
Indian Railway Board Act

Births
2 January – Jainendra Kumar, novelist (died 1988).
16 January – Dr. Manubhai P. Vaidya, educationist and recipient of Best Teacher Award from Dr. S. Radhakrishnan, the President of India (died 1966).
18 March － Malti Bedekar, feminist author(died 2001).
21 March – Kushal Konwar, Indian National Congress President of Golaghat, later on first martyr of Quit India Movement. Died on 15 June 1943 hanged till death by British.
10 May – Pankaj Mullick, singer and composer (died 1978).
17 August – Bhudo Advani, actor (died 1985).
29 August – Dhyan Chand, field hockey player (died 1979).
9 September – Brahmarishi Hussain Sha, seventh head of Sri Viswa Viznana Vidya Adhyatmika Peetham and scholar (died 1981).
12 December – Mulk Raj Anand, novelist in English (died 2004).

Full date unknown
Rashid Jahan, author, short story writer and playwright (died 1952).

Deaths
19 January – Debendranath Tagore, founder in 1848 of the Brahmo Religion (born 1817).
Full Date Unknown
Protap Chunder Mozoomdar, writer and leader of the Brahmo Samaj (born in 1840)

References

 
India
Years of the 20th century in India